Thylacodes sipho, the common worm-shell, is a species of sea snail, a worm shell, a marine gastropod mollusc in the family Vermetidae, the worm snails.

Distribution
Endemic to Australia, found in all coastal states, more common in the south. The habitat is subtidal exposed reefs and rock platforms.

Description
Living in an irregularly coiled shell, up to 70 mm long, with a tube diameter of 4 to 10 mm. The early whorls of the shell are attached to a substrate such as rocks or shells, sometimes in aggregated groups. Feeding is on organic matter, trapped in strings of mucous, there is no operculum.

References

  Gmelin J.F. 1791. Caroli a Linné. Systema Naturae per regna tria naturae, secundum classes, ordines, genera, species, cum characteribus, differentiis, synonymis, locis. Lipsiae : Georg. Emanuel. Beer Vermes. Vol. 1(Part 6) pp. 3021–3910.
 Quoy, J.R. & Gaimard, J.P. 1834. Voyage de Découvertes de l'Astrolabe exécuté par Ordre du Roi, Pendant les Années 1826–1829. Paris : J. Tastu Zoologie Vol. 3 366 pp. 
 Mörch, O.A.L. 1862. Review of the Vermetidae [Part 1]. Proceedings of the Zoological Society of London 1862: 54-83
 Tate, R. & May, W.L. 1901. A revised census of the marine Mollusca of Tasmania. Proceedings of the Linnean Society of New South Wales 26(3): 344-471
 Cotton, B.C. 1959. South Australian Mollusca. Archaeogastropoda. Handbook of the Flora and Fauna of South Australia. Adelaide : South Australian Government Printer 449 pp.
 Hedley, C. 1916. A preliminary index of the Mollusca of Western Australia. Journal and Proceedings of the Royal Society of Western Australia 1: 152-226 
 Iredale, T. & McMichael, D.F. 1962. A reference list of the marine Mollusca of New South Wales. Memoirs of the Australian Museum 11: 1–109
 Wilson, B. 1993. Australian Marine Shells. Prosobranch Gastropods. Kallaroo, Western Australia : Odyssey Publishing Vol. 1 408 pp.
 Bieler, R. & Petit, R.E. 2011. Catalogue of Recent and fossil “worm-snail” taxa of the families Vermetidae, Siliquariidae, and Turritellidae (Mollusca: Caenogastropoda). Zootaxa 2948: 1-103

External links
 Lamarck, J.B. (1818). Histoire naturelle des Animaux sans Vertèbres, préséntant les caractères généraux et particuliers de ces animaux, leur distribution, leurs classes, leurs familles, leurs genres, et la citation des principales espèces qui s'y rapportent; precedes d'une Introduction offrant la determination des caracteres essentiels de l'Animal, sa distinction du vegetal et desautres corps naturels, enfin, l'Exposition des Principes fondamentaux de la Zoologie. Paris, Deterville. 612 pp
 Beechey, D. 2007. Serpulorbis sipho (Lamarck, 1818). The seashells of New South Wales website
 Gastropods.com: Thylacodes sipho

Vermetidae
Gastropods described in 1818
Gastropods of Australia